Assegaai River, originates north of Wakkerstroom, Mpumalanga, South Africa, and runs into the Heyshope Dam, southeast of Piet Retief.  When it enters Eswatini it is known as the Mkhondvo River and it cuts through the mountains forming the Mahamba Gorge. In Eswatini it flows generally northeastward and eventually into the Usuta River.

Tributaries of the Assegaai include the Ngulane River, the Anysspruit, the Boesmanspruit, and the Klein Assegaai River.

Notes and references

See also
 List of rivers of South Africa
 List of reservoirs and dams in South Africa

Rivers of Mpumalanga